Pollenia bulgarica is a species of cluster fly in the family Polleniidae.

Distribution
Armenia, Azerbaijan, Bulgaria, Greece, Hungary, Iran, Moldova, Poland, Romania, Slovakia, Turkey, Ukraine.

References

Polleniidae
Insects described in 1939
Diptera of Europe
Diptera of Asia